The 1980–81 Yorkshire Cup was the seventy-third occasion on which the  Yorkshire Cup competition had been held.

Leeds winning the trophy by beating Hull Kingston Rovers by the score of 8-7

The match was played at Fartown Ground, Huddersfield, now in West Yorkshire. The attendance was 9,751 and receipts were £15,578

This was Leeds' eighth victory (and the second of two consecutive victories - for the  third time within the  sequence) in what has been eight times in the space of thirteen seasons.

Background 
This season there were no junior/amateur clubs taking part, no new entrants and no "leavers" and so the total of entries remained the  same at sixteen.

This in turn resulted in no byes in the first round.

Competition and results

Round 1 
Involved  8 matches (with no byes) and 16 clubs

Round 2 - Quarter-finals 
Involved 4 matches and 8 clubs

Round 3 – Semi-finals  
Involved 2 matches and 4 clubs

Final

Teams and scorers 

Scoring - Try = three points - Goal = two points - Drop goal = one point

The road to success

Notes and comments 
1 * Fartown was the home ground of Huddersfield from 1878 to the end of the 1991-92 season to Huddersfield Town FC's Leeds Road stadium, and then to the McAlpine Stadium in 1994. Fartown remained as a sports/Rugby League ground but is now rather dilapidated, and is only used for staging amateur rugby league games.

2 * Neil Hague -The player number given is as shown in the  Rothmans Yearbook 1990-91 and also 1991-92. The  RUGBYLEAGUEproject  shows  Neil Hague as a centre (numbered as 4)

3 * John Atkinson - The player number given is as shown in the  Rothmans Yearbook 1990-91 and also 1991-92. The  RUGBYLEAGUEproject  shows  John Atkinson as winger (numbered as 5)

4 * Willie Oulton   The player number given is as shown in the  Rothmans Yearbook 1990-91 and also 1991-92. The  RUGBYLEAGUEproject  shows  Willie Oulton as the full back (numbered as 1)

General information for those unfamiliar 
The Rugby League Yorkshire Cup competition was a knock-out competition between (mainly professional) rugby league clubs from  the  county of Yorkshire. The actual area was at times increased to encompass other teams from  outside the  county such as Newcastle, Mansfield, Coventry, and even London (in the form of Acton & Willesden).

The Rugby League season always (until the onset of "Summer Rugby" in 1996) ran from around August-time through to around May-time and this competition always took place early in the season, in the Autumn, with the final taking place in (or just before) December (The only exception to this was when disruption of the fixture list was caused during, and immediately after, the two World Wars)

See also 
1980–81 Rugby Football League season
Rugby league county cups

References

External links
Saints Heritage Society
1896–97 Northern Rugby Football Union season at wigan.rlfans.com 
Hull&Proud Fixtures & Results 1896/1897
Widnes Vikings - One team, one passion Season In Review - 1896-97
The Northern Union at warringtonwolves.org

1980 in English rugby league
RFL Yorkshire Cup